Two ships of the United States Navy have borne the name Callaghan, in honor of Rear Admiral Daniel J. Callaghan.

 , was a  guided missile destroyer, launched in 1979 and struck in 1998.

References

United States Navy ship names